The Battle of Yavi (also called "the Surprise at Yavi") took place on November 15, 1816, and was one of the military battles to obtain Argentina's independence from Spain.

The Army of the North was defeated at the battle. As a result, the northern border of the Argentine territory collapsed and the provinces of Salta and Jujuy were invaded by the Spaniards. The government in Buenos Aires decided then to continue the fight for independence through the Pacific flank (present-day Chile), under the command of General San Martín, while Salta's caudillo Martín Miguel de Güemes led a guerrilla war to keep at bay the royalist army in the northern provinces. This campaign is retrospectively known as La Guerra Gaucha ("The Gaucho War") after a 1905 novel by Leopoldo Lugones.

The royalist officers opposing him were Pedro Antonio de Olañeta, Juan Guillermo de Marquieguy, and Field Marshal José de la Serna. The independentist troops at Yavi were commanded by Juan José Feliciano Alejo Fernández Campero, popularly known as Marquis of Yavi, as commander of the eastern flank of General Güemes' army. Fernández Campero was a Spaniard landowner who supported the revolution.

External links 
 Ejército del Norte
 argentinaturismo
 Página 12

Conflicts in 1816
Battles of the Spanish American wars of independence
Battles of the Argentine War of Independence
History of Jujuy Province
1816 in Bolivia
1816 in Argentina
November 1816 events
Yavi